Logy Bay-Middle Cove-Outer Cove is a town in the Canadian province of Newfoundland and Labrador. It is located within a 10 minutes' drive from downtown St. John's preceding the Town of Torbay on the eastern tip of the Avalon Peninsula.

History 
The area encompassing Logy Bay-Middle Cove-Outer Cove is within the boundaries of lands granted to the London and Bristol Company in 1610.  In 1627, the company experienced financial difficulties and evidently made lands available to private groups.  The name Logy Bay itself first appears on Southwood's map of = 1675, however, permanent settlement did not begin until the early 19th century.  The earliest record of settlement in Logy Bay is from 1818 when Luke Ryan, a fisherman, sought permission to build a fishing room.  The earliest records of settlement in Outer Cove and Middle Cove appear around 1827, but occupation here most likely predated this year.

The early settlers of  Logy Bay-Middle Cove-Outer Cove were immigrants predominantly from the Irish counties of Kilkenny, Waterford, Wexford, and Cork. In particular, the town of Inistioge in Kilkenny was the origin of most of the pioneers of Logy Bay.  These early settlers were attracted to the area by the easy access to the excellent fishing grounds that lay just offshore and by the good farmland that dotted the region.

Between 1827 and 1830 there were 9 petitions for land in Logy Bay, 3 in Middle Cove and 30 in Outer Cove. By the 1850s, the Irish had established themselves and proceeded to shape the landscape. Irish heritage is still strong today and can be seen in such things as religion, folkways, music, and dialect.

Climate 
Logy Bay-Middle Cover-Outer Cove has a humid continental climate (Dfb) with long, cold, and snowy winters, though not very cold by Canadian standards, and short, mild, and rainy summers with cool nights.

Demographics 

See also 
List of cities and towns in Newfoundland and Labrador

References

External links

The Town of Logy Bay-Middle Cove-Outer Cove
The Unofficial Logy Bay-Middle Cove-Outer Cove Web Site 
Logy Bay-Middle Cove-Outer Cove - Encyclopedia of Newfoundland and Labrador, vol. 3, p. 361-362.

Populated coastal places in Canada
Towns in Newfoundland and Labrador